Eric Gonzalez may refer to:

 Eric González (born 1986), Spanish baseball pitcher
 Eric Gonzalez (lawyer), Kings County district attorney in Brooklyn, New York
 Eric Gonzalez (musician) (born 1995), Mexican hip hop musician, rapper, songwriter and record producer
 Erik González (born 1991) Dominican Republic baseball infielder
 Eric Gonzalez (soccer), (born 1994), American soccer player